Edward Applebaum (September 28, 1937 – January 7, 2020) was an American composer of contemporary classical music.

Born in Los Angeles, United States of America, Applebaum began his career as a jazz pianist and conductor. He received a B.A. (1962), M.A. (1963), and Ph.D. (1966) from the University of California, Los Angeles, and also studied at the Royal Academy of Music in Stockholm, Sweden. His primary teachers were Henri Lazarof and Lukas Foss. In Sweden, he also studied  with Ingvar Lidholm.

Applebaum taught composition at the University of Houston and had previously taught at the Shepherd School of Music at Rice University in Texas, Edith Cowan University in Australia, the University of California, Santa Barbara, Florida State University, and in Norway. He also lectured at The Jung Center of Houston. His notable students include Donald Crockett and Carl Faia.

In 1984, Applebaum received a first-place Kennedy Center Friedheim Award in Music Composition for his Symphony No. 2. His most notable work is The Princess in the Garden for string orchestra, composed in 1985.

Applebaum also held a particular scholarly interest in the subject of psychotherapy and the arts. He had been married to the composer Allyson Brown Applebaum (now Allyson Applebaum Wells).

References

External links
 Biography of Applebaum at ZALA films
 Biography of Applebaum at the website of the University of Houston

1937 births
2020 deaths
People from Los Angeles
20th-century American composers
20th-century classical composers
21st-century American composers
21st-century classical composers
American classical composers
American male classical composers
Florida State University faculty
Pupils of Lukas Foss
Rice University faculty
UCLA School of the Arts and Architecture alumni
University of California, Santa Barbara faculty
University of Houston faculty
20th-century American male musicians
21st-century American male musicians